Secamonopsis is a genus of shrubs in the Apocynaceae. It has only two species, both of which are endemic to Madagascar:

Secamonopsis madagascariensis Jum.
Secamonopsis microphylla Civeyrel & Klack

References

Secamonoideae
Endemic flora of Madagascar
Apocynaceae genera